The Hennchata is a cocktail consisting of Hennessy cognac and Mexican rice horchata agua fresca. It was invented in 2013 by Jorge Sánchez at his Chaco's Mexican restaurant in San Jose, California.

Recipe
The Hennchata consists of 4 oz horchata plus a 1.5-oz (50 ml) bottle of Hennessy V.S. Jorge Sánchez, the originator, serves it with a straw in a thick-walled, stemmed chavela glass with the bottle of cognac inverted in a plastic holder clipped to the rim; the brandy bottle empties itself as the level of horchata falls, making the drink more alcoholic as it is consumed.

Origin
The drink was created by Jorge Sánchez of Gilroy, after he took over Chaco's Mexican restaurant in downtown San Jose. Since its launch in February 2013, an average of 85 a day have been sold, more than 17,000 in a year, and the restaurant has become the largest seller of Hennessy bottles in Northern California. LVMH executives have visited and invited Sanchez to red-carpet events.

See also

 List of cocktails

References

Cocktails with brandy
Food and drink in the San Francisco Bay Area
Culture of San Jose, California
Aguas frescas